John Hammerton may refer to:

 John Alexander Hammerton (1871–1949), British encyclopedist
 John Hammerton (footballer) (1900–1978), English footballer